Mud hen is an alternative name for the American coot (Fulica americana).

Mud hen or mudhen may also refer to:

 Toledo Mud Hens, a minor league baseball team named for the bird
 Hawaiian coot, another species of Fulica
 Hawaiian gallinule, another bird species within the Rallidae
 Project Mudhen, a Central Intelligence Agency project focused on columnist Jack Anderson
 A U.S. Air Force nickname for the F-15E Strike Eagle
 A nickname for the D&RGW K-27 locomotive
 Mud Hen 17, a sailboat named after the American coot
 Lake trout with a particularly dark coloration

See also
 Mud Hen Lake (disambiguation)